Qovaq-e Sofla (also Romanized as Qovāq-e Soflá; also known as Qavāq and Qovāq) is a village in Anguran Rural District, Anguran District, Mahneshan County, Zanjan Province, Iran. At the 2006 census, its population was 537, in 119 families.

References 

Populated places in Mahneshan County